The Rocky Mountain Rendezvous was an annual rendezvous, held between 1825 to 1840 at various locations, organized by a fur trading company at which trappers and mountain men sold their furs and hides and replenished their supplies. The fur companies assembled teamster-driven mule trains which carried whiskey and supplies to a pre-announced location each spring-summer and set up a trading fair (the rendezvous). At the end of the rendezvous, the teamsters packed the furs out, either to Fort Vancouver in the Pacific Northwest for the British companies or to one of the northern Missouri River ports such as St. Joseph, Missouri, for American companies. Early explorer and trader Jacques La Ramee organized a group of independent free trappers to the first ever gathering as early as 1815 at the junction of the North Platte and  Laramie Rivers after befriending numerous native American tribes. 

Rendezvous were known to be lively, joyous places, where all were allowed—fur trappers, Indians, native trapper wives and children, harlots, travelers and later tourists—who would venture from as far as Europe to observe the festivities. James Beckwourth describes: "Mirth, songs, dancing, shouting, trading, running, jumping, singing, racing, target-shooting, yarns, frolic, with all sorts of extravagances that white men or Indians could invent."

Rendezvous are still celebrated as gatherings of like-minded individuals. The fur trading rendezvous are celebrated by traditional black-powder rifle clubs in the U.S. and Canada. These events range from small gatherings sponsored by local clubs to large gatherings like the Pacific Primitive Rendezvous, the Rocky Mountain National Rendezvous, and others. They include many of the activities as the originals, centering on shooting muzzle-loading rifles, trade guns and shotguns; throwing knives and tomahawks; primitive archery; as well as cooking, dancing, singing, the telling of tall tales and of past rendezvous. Personas taken on by participants include trappers, traders, housewives, Native Americans, frontiersmen, free-trappers and others, including soldiers.

 Locations 

 1815: LaRamée's rendezvous, at the junction of the North Platte and the Laramie rivers, Wyoming.
 1825: McKinnon, Wyoming. The first rendezvous of white traders and trappers in the Rocky Mountains occurred in July 1825 just north of McKinnon along Henrys Fork. They joined members of William Henry Ashley's expedition.  At this rendezvous, Jedediah Smith became Ashley's partner in the fur trade.
 1826: Cache Valley, Utah, either at today's Cove or at the more southern Hyrum. After the rendezvous, Ashley and Smith continued up to the Bear River where they met up with David Jackson and William Sublette.  Smith, Jackson and Sublette bought out Ashley's share of the fur company.
 1827: Bear Lake, near today's Laketown, Utah. Conflicts and fights with Blackfoot Indians occurred during the meeting.
 1828: Bear Lake. More fights with the Blackfoot occurred.
 1829: Lander, Wyoming.
 1830: Riverton, Wyoming. Smith, Jackson and Sublette sold their company to Jim Bridger, Thomas Fitzpatrick, Milton Sublette (the brother of William), Henry Freab and Baptiste Gervais.
 1831: Cache Valley. The support trek was late, so there was no real rendezvous.
 1832: Pierre' Hole, east of Rexburg, Idaho.
 1833: Upper Green River Rendezvous Site, Daniel, Wyoming.
 1834: Granger, Wyoming. The Rocky Mountain Fur Company was dissolved, and the American Fur Company took over supplying the rendezvous.
 1835: Daniel, Wyoming.
 1836: Daniel, Wyoming.
 1837: Daniel, Wyoming.
 1838: Riverton, Wyoming.
 1839: Daniel, Wyoming.
 1840: Daniel, Wyoming.

See also
Red River Jig
Fur trade in Montana

References

 Further reading 
 Rocky Mountain Rendezvous'', Fred R. Gowans, Gibbs Smith Publisher

External links

 Mountain Men and Life in the Rocky Mountain West - Rendezvous

 The Fur Trapper.com - Mountain Man Rendezvous Sites (Archive Copy Accessed: February 12, 2018)
 Idaho Public Television - Rendezvous

Festivals in the United States
Fur trade
American folklore
/
Rocky Mountains
Festivals established in 1825
 
1840 festivals